Metalogix Software is an independent software vendor, founded in 2001 in Vancouver, British Columbia and was acquired by Quest Software, Inc. in July 2018. Metalogix develops, sells, and provides support for content infrastructure software for Microsoft SharePoint, Microsoft Exchange and Microsoft Office 365 platforms.

Metalogix sells an array of products for managing content infrastructure. The company's primary product is Content Matrix, which migrates content between SharePoint versions.
Metalogix is part of Quest Software, Inc. having been acquired in July 2018.

See also
Axceler, a company acquired by Metalogix in 2013.

References

External links
CMS Wire articles on Metalogix

Software companies based in Washington, D.C.
Software companies established in 2001
2001 establishments in British Columbia
2018 mergers and acquisitions
Quest Software
Defunct software companies of the United States